St. Jerome the Priest is a bronze statue, by Ivan Meštrović, located at 2343 Massachusetts Avenue, Northwest, Washington, D.C.

Ivan Meštrović donated this work to the Croatian Franciscan Fathers, who commissioned it as Saint Jerome. Jerome was born on the territory of modern Croatia. This Meštrović statue was originally located at the Franciscan Fathers' Abbey on 1359 Monroe Street, N.E., Washington, D.C., and was later moved to the front of the Croatian Embassy on Embassy Row. 
 
The inscription reads:
(On front of base:)

See also
 List of public art in Washington, D.C., Ward 2

References

External links
 
 http://dcmemorials.com/index_indiv0001560.htm

1954 establishments in Washington, D.C.
1954 sculptures
Bronze sculptures in Washington, D.C.
Croatian-American history
Croatian art
Jerome
Monuments and memorials in Washington, D.C.
Outdoor sculptures in Washington, D.C.
Sculptures by Ivan Meštrović
Sculptures of men in Washington, D.C.
Statues in Washington, D.C.